Meydan Racecourse is a racecourse in Dubai, United Arab Emirates. The grandstand is a half mile in length, and can accommodate over 60,000 spectators.

Meydan opened on 27 March 2010, replacing Nad Al Sheba Racecourse, which formerly occupied the same site. It includes a horse racing museum, gallery and five-star hotel and nine-hole golf course. When not in use for racing it serves as a business and conference centre. The track's interior was also used as a filming location for the film Star Trek Beyond, depicting the docking bay where the USS Enterprise is moored, including the bar scene during the film's climax which contains a ship construction bay.

The Meydan grandstand

The  Meydan Racecourse includes Meydan Marina, The Meydan, the world's first five-star trackside hotel with 285 rooms, two race tracks and the Grandstand, which consists of a hotel, restaurants, a racing museum and 72 corporate suites for entertaining throughout the year. It has a 2,400 m left-handed turf race track and a left-handed 8.75-furlong (1,750 m) dirt course. It operates from November through March and features the Winter Racing Challenge, Dubai International Racing Carnival and the Dubai World Cup Night. The Dubai World Cup is the world's richest race day with over US$26.25 million in prize money.

The Racecourse district occupies 67 million ft² (620 ha); the overall Meydan City development however is 200 million ft² (1,900 ha). It is divided into four sub-districts: Meydan Racecourse, Meydan Metropolis, Meydan Horizons, and Meydan Godolphin Parks. Meydan is closely affiliated with Mohammed bin Rashid Al Maktoum, UAE Vice President and Prime Minister and Ruler of Dubai.

Lady Gaga performed there on 10 September 2014 as part of her world tour, ArtRave: The Artpop Ball, in support of her third studio album ARTPOP. The racecourse has also hosted concerts by Elton John, Santana, Kylie Minogue, Janet Jackson and Sia.

Major Thoroughbred races
Dubai World Cup
Dubai Golden Shaheen
Dubai Sheema Classic
Dubai Turf
Godolphin Mile
Jebel Hatta

See also 
Nad Al Sheba Racecourse

References

External links
Meydan Racecourse
Dubai Racing Club

 
Horse racing venues in the United Arab Emirates
Sports venues completed in 2010
Sports venues in Dubai
2010 establishments in the United Arab Emirates